Amerila madagascariensis is a moth of the subfamily Arctiinae. It was described by Jean Baptiste Boisduval in 1847. It is found on Madagascar.

References

 , 1849: [Ins. Lep.]. In:  Dictionnaire Universel d'Histoire Naturelle Atlas 2: 19, pl. 13.
 , 1847: Catalogue des lépidoptères recueillis par M. Delegorgue peudaut les années 1838-1844 à Port-Natal, au pays des Amazoulous et dans la contrée de Massilicatzi. p. 585-602. In:  Voyage dans l'Afrique australi II: 624 pp., Paris.
 , 1997: A revision of the Afrotropical taxa of the genus Amerila Walker (Lepidoptera, Arctiidae). Systematic Entomology 22 (1): 1-44.
 , 1879: Lepidoptera Madagascariensia; species novæ. Bulletin de la Société Philomathique (7) 3: 132-143, Paris.

Moths described in 1847
Amerilini
Moths of Madagascar
Moths of Africa